Lincoln Township is a township in Clay County, Iowa, USA.  As of the 2000 census, its population was 260.

History
Lincoln Township was created in 1867.

Geography
According to the USGS, it contains three cemeteries: Bethlehem Lutheran, Lincoln and Prairie Creek.

Notes

References
 USGS Geographic Names Information System (GNIS)

External links
 US-Counties.com
 City-Data.com

Townships in Clay County, Iowa
Townships in Iowa